Dolutegravir/lamivudine/tenofovir (DTG/3TC/TDF) is a fixed-dose combination antiretroviral medication used to treat HIV/AIDS. It is a combination of dolutegravir, lamivudine, and tenofovir disoproxil. , it is listed by the World Health Organization (WHO) as the first line treatment for adults, with tenofovir/lamivudine/efavirenz as an alternative. It is taken by mouth.

Side effects may include trouble sleeping, weight gain, and rash. While there are concerns that use during pregnancy results in a 0.2% increased risk of neural tube defects in the baby, this does not rule out its use. Use remains recommended after the first trimester. Use is not recommended in those with kidney problems. The combination is a type of antiretroviral therapy.

It is on the World Health Organization's List of Essential Medicines. In some countries it is available as a generic medication. It is tentatively approved in the United States as of 2019, full approval is pending expiration of the US patents on dolutegravir (Tivicay) and tenofovir disoproxil (Viread).

Medical uses
As of 2019, it is listed by the World Health Organization (WHO) as the first-line treatment for adults with HIV/AIDS, with tenofovir/lamivudine/efavirenz as an alternative. It may be used in people with both HIV and tuberculosis, however if the person is on rifampicin a larger dose of dolutegravir is needed.

Side effects
Side effects may include trouble sleeping and weight gain. While there are concerns that use during pregnancy results in a 0.2% increased risk of neural tube defects in the baby, this does not rule out its use. Use remains recommended after the first trimester. It should not be used with dofetilide.

Society and culture

Economics 
It is considered more cost effective than tenofovir/lamivudine/efavirenz as of 2019.

References

External links
 
 
 
 

Fixed dose combination (antiretroviral)
World Health Organization essential medicines
Wikipedia medicine articles ready to translate